They Both Die at the End is a young adult novel written by American author Adam Silvera and published on September 5, 2017, by HarperTeen. It is Silvera's third novel and focuses on two teenage boys, Mateo and Rufus, who discover that they only have one day left to live.

In April 2020, due to #BookTok, a popular hashtag for readers on social media platform TikTok, the book's popularity saw a resurgence, once again placing it on The New York Times Best Seller list.

Plot summary 

Shortly after midnight on September 5, 2017, Mateo receives a phone call from Death-Cast, a company that rose to prominence seven years prior and is able to predict the deaths of individuals, informing him that he is now a Decker, someone with only twenty-four hours (or less) left to live. Mateo initially intends to spend his End Day in his bedroom but decides to try to push himself to truly live, reluctantly downloading Last Friend, an app developed to help lonely Deckers find someone to spend their End Day with. Rufus is in the middle of beating up Peck, his ex-girlfriend Aimee's new boyfriend, when he received a call from Death-Cast claiming he is going to die in the next 24 hours. His friends Malcolm and Tagoe remind Rufus not to get carried away because of the news. He allows Peck to leave so that he can return to his foster home to say his goodbyes. Rufus, Aimee, Malcolm and Tagoe, collectively known as The Plutos, hold a funeral for Rufus at his foster home but it is interrupted by Peck, who calls the police to have Rufus arrested for assault. Rufus flees and goes on the run, downloading Last Friend so that he won't live out his final day alone.

Mateo and Rufus meet through Last Friend and decide to spend the day accompanying each other. Rufus agrees to go with Mateo to the hospital so Mateo can visit his father, who has been in a coma for two weeks. Mateo says goodbye to his father and leaves him a note for him to read when he wakes up. Mateo and Rufus then go to see Lidia, Mateo's best friend, and her baby daughter (and Mateo's goddaughter) Penny. Not wanting to make Lidia upset, Mateo pretends everything is normal, but leaves her an envelope of cash before leaving and blocks her phone number. Rufus receives a call from Aimee telling him that Malcolm and Tagoe were arrested when they attempted to hold off the police to give him more time to escape. Rufus opens up about his past, explaining that his parents and sister all received a phone call from Death-Cast on the same day and drowned when their car crashed into the Hudson river, leaving him as the only survivor. Rufus and Mateo discuss the plans they had for their life: Mateo always wanted to be an architect and Rufus wishes he could have turned his passion for photography into a career. As their friendship deepens, Mateo becomes bolder and Rufus begins to take color photos for his Instagram page, @rufusonpluto, as opposed to his usual monochrome posts, to signify his End Day. Rufus buys Mateo some Lego bricks and, as they are leaving, they barely manage to survive an explosion at a nearby gym. Mateo builds a sanctuary while they are on the train using the bricks. Rufus and Mateo head to the cemetery so that Mateo can visit his mother's grave, only to find a groundskeeper is in the process of digging Mateo's grave beside hers. Mateo leaves his Lego sanctuary at his mother's grave and sits down inside his own with Rufus, talking about the afterlife and debating what will happen to them in the near future.

Rufus and Mateo go to Make-A-Moment, a center for Deckers where they can experience dangerous activities without fear, and the two fake skydive. Unimpressed, Mateo asks Lidia to meet them at the Travel Arena. Rufus, Mateo and Lidia go on an "around the world in eighty minutes" tour at the Arena and jump off of a waterfall, allowing Rufus to conquer his fear of the water. Rufus receives a call from Malcolm and Tagoe, who were released from custody, and tells them to bring Aimee and meet him at the Graveyard, a club for Deckers.

The group dance together at Graveyard and Rufus convinces Mateo to sing karaoke with him. After their performance, Mateo finally works up the courage to kiss Rufus, who asks why it took him so long. Rufus is able to say a proper goodbye to the Plutos and Mateo tries to help Lidia comprehend her life without him. Peck and his gang arrive at the club, having tracked Rufus using his Instagram posts, with a loaded gun. Peck tries to shoot Rufus but Aimee tries to talk him down, giving Mateo enough time to cause a commotion, making Peck drop the gun. Mateo and Rufus return to Mateo's apartment and Mateo asks if they can go back to the hospital so that he can come out to his father and tell him about their End Day. Mateo sings and plays the piano for Rufus, who videos the moment before taking a goofy picture with Mateo for his final Instagram post. They lie in bed and confess their love to one another, both wishing that they had met sooner. They fall asleep in each other's arms, agreeing that they will stay together in the safety of their bed forever.

Mateo wakes up first and goes into the kitchen to make peppermint tea, hoping to cheer Rufus up. He absentmindedly turns on the burner that, which he had told his neighbor not to fix that earlier that day since he knew he would be dying. The burner explodes and Rufus wakes up because of the smoke and flees the apartment. Then he runs back into the burning building and drags Mateo's dead body out, begging him to wake up. He lies to the paramedics and tells them Mateo is not a Decker and needs to go to the hospital. However, Mateo is declared dead at the scene and a devastated Rufus calls Lidia to inform her. Refusing medical treatment, Rufus is determined to fulfill Mateo's dying wish and visits his father in the hospital. He tells the unconscious man all about their day together and says that his son was brave, fought his fears and was able to truly live. He leaves a note telling Mateo's father who Rufus was and to see the photos of him and Mateo on the Instagram account.

On his way to the park to spend his final hours, Rufus puts on his headphones to listen to the video he took of Mateo singing and steps out into the road without looking.

Subplots 
Subplots focus on minor characters that are intertwined with the main plot line.

Delilah's story: she receives a call from Death-Cast, but believes it to be a prank. She conducts an interview with Howie Maldonado but he is killed by Peck and his gang when they run in front of his car. The last chapter focusing on her is her at Althea's Diner. She calls Victor, her ex-boyfriend, who says that he didn't prank her with the Death-Cast call. Delilah breaks out in sobs, saying she wasted her last day because she thought he pranked her to get back at her for breaking up with him. Victor tells her to stay put and rushes to the diner. This diner is across the street from where Rufus went to spend his final hour. It is implied Victor is the one that hits Rufus with his car. Her fate remains unknown.

Zoe's story: she is a Decker who only has one chapter, where she spends the day with Gabriella.

Deirde's story: like Zoe, she only has one chapter, where she contemplates suicide but is dissuaded by the appearance of Mateo and Rufus.

Dalma's story: she only has one chapter too, where she discusses the uses and benefits of her app, Last Friend.

Vin's story: his only chapter is his decision to murder-suicide with the bomb that nearly killed Rufus and Mateo.

Officer Andrade's story: his only chapter talks about his release of Malcolm and Tageo from custody, his partner Graham's death, and his efforts to shut down the website that caused it.

Characters 
 Mateo Torrez – a shy, skinny, and socially anxious boy who has spent the majority of his life staying inside.
Rufus Emeterio – a Cuban-origin street-smart foster child with a troubled past.
Lidia Vargas – Mateo's best friend and the mother of his goddaughter Penny. Lidia lost her boyfriend Christian a year prior to the events of the novel after he received a Death-Cast call. Penny is their daughter.
 Mateo Torrez Sr. – Mateo's father who has been in a coma for two weeks.
 The Plutos – the collective name for the group that is from the same foster home. The Plutos consist of Rufus, his two closest friends, Malcolm Anthony and Tagoe Hayes and his ex-girlfriend Aimee DuBois.
Patrick "Peck" Gavin – Aimee's new boyfriend who has a vendetta against Rufus.
Delilah Grey – a reporter who receives a call from Death-Cast but is convinced it is a prank set up by her ex-fiancé Victor who works at the company.
Andrea Donahue – the Death-Cast herald responsible for informing Mateo of his death.
Kendrick O'Connell and Damien Rivas – members of Peck's gang.
Howie Maldonado – a famous actor who receives a call from Death-Cast and meets with Delilah for a final interview.
Vin Pearce – a Decker and former boxer who was prevented from competing due to a genetic muscle disease.
Deirdre Clayton – an employee at Make-A-Moment who has tried to take her own life multiple times before, even when she hadn't gotten the alert, however, she decides against suicide when she sees Mateo and Rufus.
Zoe Landon – a Decker who spends her End Day with Gabriella, a girl she met on the Last Friend app.
Dalma Young – the creator of the Last Friend app.

Reception  
They Both Die at the End is a New York Times and IndieBound best seller, as well as a Junior Library Guild selection.

The book received starred reviews from Booklist, Publishers Weekly, School Library Journal, and Kirkus Reviews, as well as positive reviews from The Bulletin of the Center for Children's Books, American Review, BookPage, Common Sense Media, BuzzFeed, Children's Book and Media Review, and Teen Vogue.

Booklist called the novel "extraordinary and unforgettable." Kirkus Reviews noted that the book was "another standout from Silvera who here grapples gracefully with heavy questions about death and the meaning of a life well-lived" before concluding that They Both Die at the End is "engrossing, contemplative and as heart-wrenching as the title promises".

BuzzFeed noted that "Adam Silvera not only poignantly captures the raw emotion of facing your own mortality but also creates entirely relatable and authentic characters you'll want to follow on their journey."

American Review stated that "this book is an important contribution to young adult literature because of its humanizing portrayals of queer, adolescent characters of color." They note this is especially important "given the repeatedly cited issues of hegemonic Whiteness and heteronormativity in young adult publishing, particularly in speculative fiction."

The audiobook, narrated by Michael Crouch, Robbie Daymond, and Bahni Turpin, received a favorable review from Booklist, who noted that the voice actors brought "the full range of this story’s anguish and joy to the listener. Crouch and Daymond, voicing Mateo and Rufus, respectively, emphasize how the characters change yet remain true to themselves."

BuzzFeed named They Both Die at the End one of the best young adult books of the decade. Kirkus Reviews, BookPage, School Library Journal, Amazon, and BuzzFeed named it one of the best young adult novels of 2017, and Book Riot named it one of the best queer books of the year.

They Both Die at the End has also been analyzed in academic journals for its depiction of LGBT teens of color.

Accolades 
{| class="wikitable sortable"
!Year
!Accolade
!Result
!Ref.
|-
| rowspan="11" |2017
|Amazon Best Young Adult Books of the Year
|Selection
|
|-
|Booklist Editors' Choice: Books for Youth
|Selection
|
|-
|BookPage Teen Top Pick of September
|Selection
|
|-
|Book Riot's Best Queer Books of the Year
|Selection
|
|-
|BuzzFeed Best Young Adult Books of the Year
|Selection
|
|-
|Goodreads Choice Award for Young Adult Fiction
|Nominee
|
|-
|Junior Library Guild selection
|Selection
|
|-
|Kirkus Reviews''' Best Young Adult Books of the Year
|Selection
|
|-
|Los Angeles Public Library Best Teen Books of the Year
|Selection
|
|-
|Paste Best Young Adult Books of the Year
|Selection
|
|-
|School Library Journal’s Best Young Adult Books of the Year
|Selection
|
|-
| rowspan="4" |2018
|American Library Association's (ALA) Best Fiction for Young Adults
|Selection
|
|-
|American Library Association Rainbow List
|Top 10
|
|-
|Capitol Choices for Fourteen and Up
|Selection
|
|-
|Young Adults’ Choices Reading List
|Selection
|
|-
|2019
|BuzzFeed's Best Young Adult Books of the Decade|Selection
|
|-
|2020
|ALA Quick Picks for Reluctant Young Adult Readers
|Selection
|
|-
|2021
|Flicker Tale Children's Book Award for Older Readers
|Winner 
|
|}

 Adaptation They Both Die at the End is currently in development by eOne with Bridgerton creator Chris Van Dusen attached to executive produce and write alongside author Silvera. Previously, the adaptation was set as a half-hour television miniseries at HBO with J. J. Abrams executive producing. 

In January 2023, Netflix picked up the series with Van Dusen, Bad Bunny and Drew Comins executive producing.

 Prequel 
Prequel novel The First to Die at the End'' gives an introduction to the Death-Cast system and introduces the reader to a set of new star-crossed lovers. It was released on October 4, 2022.

References  

2017 American novels
American young adult novels
American bildungsromans
HarperCollins books
Novels set in New York City
LGBT young adult literature
Novels with gay themes
Novels with bisexual themes